Acanthoxyla is a genus of stick insects in the family Phasmatidae (tribe Acanthoxylini). All the individuals of the genus are female and reproduce asexually by parthenogenesis. However, a male Acanthoxyla inermis was recently discovered in the UK, probably the result of chromosome loss. The genus is the result of interspecific hybridisation resulting in some triploid lineages and some diploid lineages. The genus is endemic to New Zealand, but some species have been accidentally introduced elsewhere. The genus name Acanthoxyla translates from Greek as prickly stick (acantho = thorn; xyla = wood).

Species
The Catalogue of Life lists:
 Acanthoxyla fasciata (Hutton, 1899)
 Acanthoxyla geisovii (Kaup, 1866)
 Acanthoxyla huttoni Salmon, 1955
 Acanthoxyla inermis Salmon, 1955
 Acanthoxyla intermedia Salmon, 1955
 Acanthoxyla prasina (Westwood, 1859)
 Acanthoxyla speciosa Salmon, 1955
 Acanthoxyla suteri (Hutton, 1899)

See also 

 List of stick insects of New Zealand

References

External links 

Phasmatidae of New Zealand
Phasmatodea genera
Taxa named by Boris Uvarov
Phasmatidae